Catch As Catch Can is a 1967 Italian comedy film directed by Franco Indovina. It was shown as part of a retrospective on Italian comedy at the 67th Venice International Film Festival.

Plot
Bob is a famous actor of various advertising, but slowly begins to go crazy. In fact, he seems to be haunted by normal animals that do not take kindly. A bull for example, Bob throws in a river, while the mice gnaw a rope that held him suspended from a helicopter to shoot a commercial. When Bob refuses to turn advertising with other animals as extras, it is immediately fired. On the verge of despair, enters an ordinary fly, which begins to haunt the lives of the poor Bob who tries to kill her in every way, to no avail. When the fly disappears, Bob also continues to hear the annoying buzzing, beating their hands everywhere like a real fool.

Cast
 Vittorio Gassman - Bob Chiaramonte
 Martha Hyer - Luisa Chiaramonte
 Gila Golan - Emma
 Karin Skarreso - Girl Model
 Massimo Serato - Agent
 Carmelo Bene - Priest
 Steffen Zacharias - Police Inspector
 Jacques Herlin - Zoology Professor
 Claudio Gora - Cabinet Minister
 Gigi Proietti - Make-up man
 Giovanni Ivan Scratuglia - Gianfranco (as Ivan Scratuglia)

References

External links

1967 films
Italian comedy films
1960s Italian-language films
1967 comedy films
Films scored by Luis Bacalov
Films with screenplays by Tonino Guerra
Films directed by Franco Indovina
1960s Italian films